ELKS/RAB6-interacting/CAST family member 1 is a protein that in humans is encoded by the ERC1 gene. The name ELKS is derived from "protein rich in the amino acids E, L, K and S"

The protein encoded by this gene is a member of a family of RIM-binding proteins. RIMs are active zone proteins that regulate neurotransmitter release. This gene has been found fused to the receptor-type tyrosine kinase gene RET by gene rearrangement due to the translocation t(10;12)(q11;p13). Multiple transcript variants encoding different isoforms have been found for this gene. ELKS has been reported to direct vesicles with RAB6A to melanosomes.

Interactions
ERC1 has been shown to interact with RAB6A.

References

Further reading